Rohan is a commune in the Morbihan department in Brittany in north-western France. Inhabitants of Rohan are called Rohannais.

It is the home to the House of Rohan, members of which included viscounts, dukes and princes and has had a prominent role in French history. The commune's coat of arms is identical to that of the family.

Geography
Rohan is situated on the banks of the river Oust and the Canal from Nantes to Brest (which merge for a part of their journey), upstream of Josselin and at the edge of a plateau.

See also
Communes of the Morbihan department

References

External links

 Mayors of Morbihan Association 

Communes of Morbihan